Ebenezer Kobina Fosu (born 6 May 1952) is a Ghanaian politician and a member of the 1st and 2nd Parliaments of the 4th republic of Ghana, representing the Asikuma Odoben Brakwa Constituency in the central region of Ghana under the membership of the National Democratic Congress

Early life and education
Ebenezer was born on 6 May 1952 at Breman Jamra in the central region of Ghana.  He obtained a degree from the University of Ghana, Legon.  He worked as a Barrister before going into politics.  He is a Christian.

Career 
He is a lawyer by profession and a former member of Parliament for the Asikuma Odoben Brakwa constituency in the central region of Ghana.

Political career 
Ebenezer was first elected into parliament on 7 January 1993 after he emerged winner at the 1992 Ghanaian General Elections. In the 1996 Ghanaian general elections, he gained a second term in Parliament by defeating Paul Collins Appia-Ofori of the New Patriotic Party after he obtained 47.50% total valid votes cast which is equivalent to 19,523 votes while his opposition obtained 33.20% which is equivalent to 13,641 votes.  He lost his seat at the 2000 Ghanaian General Elections after being defeated by Paul C. Appiah Ofori who obtained 51.90% of the total valid votes cast which is equivalent to 16,225 votes while Ebenezer obtained 43.40% which is equivalent to 13,559 votes.

References 

1952 births
Living people
National Democratic Congress (Ghana) politicians
University of Ghana alumni
Ghanaian MPs 1993–1997
Ghanaian MPs 1997–2001
20th-century Ghanaian lawyers
Ghanaian Christians
People from Central Region (Ghana)